Baranikha is a rural locality (a village) in Tigisnkoye Rural Settlement, Vozhegodsky District, Vologda Oblast, Russia. The population was 11 as of 2002.

Geography 
Baranikha is located 52 km northwest of Vozhega (the district's administrative centre) by road. Gora is the nearest rural locality.

References 

Rural localities in Vozhegodsky District